The Portuguese Economic Journal is a triannual peer-reviewed academic journal of economics. It is published by Springer Science+Business Media on behalf of ISEG, University of Lisbon and the editor-in-chief is Luís F. Costa (ISEG). The journal was established in 2002 with Paulo Brito as its founding editor-in-chief (until 2014). The journal organizes an annual meeting, held at different Portuguese universities.

Abstracting and indexing 
The journal is abstracted and indexed in:

According to the Journal Citation Reports, the journal has a 2021 impact factor of 1.342. In their ranking of academic impact of economics journals, Kalaitzidakis et al. (2011) rank it 142nd out of 219 journals.

References

External links 

Springer Page

Economics journals
Springer Science+Business Media academic journals
Triannual journals
English-language journals
Publications established in 2002
Academic journals associated with universities and colleges